"Mantra for a State of Mind" is a song by British dance act S'Express, released as a single in September 1989. It was their penultimate top 40 hit, reaching No. 21 on the UK Singles Chart. The song formed part of their second album, Intercourse (1991).

In 2016, Primal Scream released a cover of the track on a double A-side for Record Store Day. This version featured backing vocals from original S'Express vocalist Naomi Osbourne and Jason Pierce of Spiritualized on guitar.

Critical reception
David Giles from Music Week wrote, "The only mantra here is the hypnotic sequencer which is supplemented by an almost bluesy vocal and occasional switches to other rhythmic modes. The swirling keyboards induce further levitation. A potential number one."

References

1989 songs
1989 singles
S'Express songs